Henriques may refer to:

People with the surname Henriques:
Henriques (surname)
Henriques family

In places:
Henriques Street, a street in London